Air Marshal Vikram Singh, AVSM, VSM is an officer in the Indian Air Force. Currently he is serving as the Air Officer Commanding-in-Chief (AOC-in-C), South Western Air Command. He took over the office on 1 October 2021, following the appointment of Air Marshal Sandeep Singh as the Vice Chief of the Air Staff.

Career
Vikram Singh was commissioned as a fighter pilot in the Indian Air Force on December 21, 1984. He has flying experience on MiG-21 and Mirage 2000.

Vikram Singh undertook the Flying Instructor's Course, Experimental Flight Test Course and Staff Course at Pretoria, South Africa.

He has performed Flight Test duties at the National Flight Test Centre at Aeronautic Development Agency. He had commanded an Air Force Station and served as the Air Attaché at Moscow, Russia.

He has also served at the Integrated Defence Staff Headquarters and was Assistant Chief of the Air Staff (Plans) at Air Headquarters. Previous to his present assignment, he had served as Senior Air Staff Officer for the Western Air Command from 1 October 2020 to 30 September 2021.

Honours and decorations 
During his career, Vikram Singh has been awarded the Vishisht Seva Medal (VSM) in 2009 and the Ati Vishisht Seva Medal in 2022.

Personal life 
He is the son of Air Marshal Prithi Singh who served as the Air Officer Commanding-in-Chief, Western Air Command.

Vikram Singh is married to Dr. Arathi Singh who is President of Air Force Wives Welfare Association (Regional). The couple is blessed with two children.

References 

Indian Air Force air marshals
Recipients of the Vishisht Seva Medal
Living people
1963 births
Indian air attachés